Elections in the Republic of India in 1995 included elections to six state legislative assemblies.

Legislative Assembly elections

Arunachal Pradesh

Source:

Bihar

Source:

Gujarat

Source:

Maharashtra

Source:

Manipur

Odisha

References

External links

 Election Commission of India

1995 elections in India
India
1995 in India
Elections in India by year